The Georgetown Public Policy Review (GPPR) is a nonpartisan, student-run, academic journal of the McCourt School of Public Policy at Georgetown University. Established in 1995, GPPR publishes articles and media content year-round, in addition to its feature editions. Starting in 2016, GPPR has published its peer-reviewed Spring Edition exclusively online. Previously, a print publication was published annually or biannually at the discretion of the staff.

The organization's online and spring edition provide an outlet for students, faculty, and guest writers to comment on pressing issues of the day. In 2014, GPPR began to produce podcasts to showcase its interviews and policy analysis in a new context.

References

External links
 Georgetown Public Policy Review - Main website
 GPPR Spring Edition

Academic journals edited by students
Georgetown University academic journals
Publications established in 1995
Irregular journals